Events in the year 2008 in Ukraine.

Incumbents 

 President: Viktor Yushchenko
 Prime Minister: Yulia Tymoshenko

Events 

 24 December – An explosion in an apartment block in Yevpatoria kills 27 people, leading President Viktor Yushchenko to declare December 26 a day of national mourning.

Deaths 

 4 September – Alina Vedmid, agronomist and politician (b. 1940).

References 

 
Ukraine
Ukraine
2000s in Ukraine
Years of the 21st century in Ukraine